In Tibetan cuisine, Xab Momo is a bun, usually baked or steamed, stuffed with beef or mutton.

See also
 List of stuffed dishes
 List of Tibetan dishes

References

Tibetan cuisine
Meat dishes
Stuffed dishes
Dumplings